The discography of Tally Hall, an American rock band, consists of two studio albums, two compilation albums, five extended plays (EPs), six singles, one promotional single, nine music videos and five appearances on compilation and soundtrack albums or in video collections. The band was formed in 2002 while attending the University of Michigan. A year later, they recorded their debut EP, Party Boobytrap, followed by their second release, Welcome to Tally Hall, in 2004. The latter incorporated a larger spectrum of styles, and the two EPs were combined on the full-length Complete Demos the same year.

In 2005, the band released their debut album Marvin's Marvelous Mechanical Museum on the local label Quack! Media. The track "Good Day" was featured on the teen drama series The O.C. in 2006, and Tally Hall was subsequently signed to Atlantic Records, who released a re-recorded version of the album in 2008. The band's second album, Good & Evil, was funded by the label and released in 2011 by Quack! Media after Tally Hall split ways with Atlantic. A second demo compilation titled Admittedly Incomplete Demos was released in 2015 through Bandcamp.

Albums

Studio albums

Compilation albums

Extended plays

Singles

Promotional singles

Other charting songs

Music videos

Appearances on compilations and soundtracks

Music

Video

References

Notes

Citations

Discographies of American artists